Héctor Rubén Chiles Huaca (born 11 February 1971) is an Ecuadorian former cyclist. He competed in the men's individual road race at the 1996 Summer Olympics.

Major results
1992
 1st  Road race, Pan American Road Championships
1997
 1st Overall Vuelta al Ecuador
2001
 1st Overall Vuelta al Ecuador
2002
 1st Overall Vuelta al Ecuador
 3rd  Road race, Pan American Road Championships
2005
 1st Overall Vuelta al Ecuador
1st Stage 9
2007
 3rd Time trial, National Road Championships
2009
 1st Stage 5 Vuelta al Ecuador

References

External links
 

1971 births
Living people
Ecuadorian male cyclists
Olympic cyclists of Ecuador
Cyclists at the 1996 Summer Olympics
People from Carchi Province